Pawan Kumar Kajal is an Indian politician, and a member of Himachal Pradesh Legislative Assembly.

Kajal was the head of Congress Working committee. Kajal and another congress MLA Lakhvinder Singh Rana left congress and joined BJP in August 2022.

References

People from Kangra, Himachal Pradesh
Former members of Indian National Congress from Himachal Pradesh
Living people
Himachal Pradesh MLAs 2017–2022
Bharatiya Janata Party politicians from Himachal Pradesh
Year of birth missing (living people)